The Union Jack, or Union Flag, is the flag of the United Kingdom. 

Union Jack may also refer to:

 Union Jack of Norway and Sweden, a navy jack and consular flag (1844–1905)
 Jack of the United States, a navy jack

Comics
 Union Jack (comics), a fictional character in the Marvel Comics Universe
 Union Jack (Joseph Chapman), the third incarnation of the character
 Union Jack Jackson, a character in the Warlord comic book

Music and dance
 Union Jack (band), an English trance group
 Union Jack and the Megatones, a US ska band
 Union Jack (ballet), a ballet by George Balanchine
 Union Jacks, album by The Babys
 Union JACK, a radio station in the United Kingdom.

Periodicals
 Union Jack (American newspaper), a nationally-circulated monthly U.S. newspaper aimed at British expatriates, published from 1982 to July 2016.
 Union Jack (magazine), a UK story paper of the late 19th and early 20th century.

Other uses
Union Jack dress
 Union Jack Club, a London club for members of the British Armed Services
 Union Jack, a type of bet offered by UK bookmakers
 Union Jack, the name of a London bus company of the 1900s, originally called London Road Car Company
 Saluting the Union Jack
Formally means Naval salute
Informally means drinking (e.g., as described by Roger Sterling Mad Men, episode 3.6)
Delias mysis, a butterfly of Australia, New Guinea and neighbouring islands